Gershon Edelstein (born 18 April 1923) is rosh yeshiva of the Ponevezh Yeshiva, president of the Vaad Hayeshivos, and the spiritual leader of the Degel HaTorah party in Israel. He is widely considered to be the Gadol Hador by the Litvish community

Biography

Early life 
Edelstein was born in the town of Shumyatch (Shumyachi), near Smolensk, in the Soviet Union, to Rabbi Zvi Yehuda Edelstein and Miriam Mobshovich. Zvi Esdelstein was rabbi of Shumyatch; his father Rabbi Yerachmiel Gershon Edelstein, was the author of Ben Aryeh on [[Talmud|Shas]. Miriam's father, Rabbi Mordechai Shlomo Mobshovich, wss rabbi of Malstovka (Krasnopillia).

His mother obtained fake birth certificates with the wrong date of birth for her sons so that they would be registered as three years younger than their real age and would not attend a school under the supervision of the Yevsektzia, the extremely anti-religious Jewish branch of the Communist Party. He learned Torah from Rabbi Zalman Leib Estolin, in exchange for his father Rabbi Zvi Yehuda teaching Torah. Following his mother's illness with typhus, he was sent with his younger brother Yaakov to his aunt, Rebbitzin Rivka Tzvia Paz, in the city of Klimovich (Klimavichy), where they studied Torah secretly with Rabbi Mordechai Eliyahu Shneur, one of Rabbi Edelstein's students. There they also received the news of their mother's death.

In the month of Nisan 5694 (March–April 1934), his father succeeded in obtaining a permit to leave for Palestine, and asked his sons to return to their home in Shumyatch. At that time, his grandmother Rebbetzin Reizel ran the household and raised the brothers, so that their father could study Torah. In Iyar (April–May) Rabbi Zvi and his family travelled on the liner Novorossiysk from Odessa to Palestine, arriving on Lag Ba'omer. The family traveled to Jerusalem, where they visited Rabbi Isser Zalman Meltzer and Rabbi Avraham Yitzchak HaCohen Kook, who had studied with their grandfather Rabbi Yerachmiel at the Volozhin yeshiva.

In Elul 5794 (1934), after several months of wandering between relatives, their father settled in Ramat Hasharon. The brothers Yaakov and Gershon slept on the floor. Since there was no religious school in Ramat Hasharon, the father studied with his sons at home, sitting on orange crates due to lack of furniture. They studied Gemara with Rosh and Rif, and, by some of the tractates, also with Tur and Beit Yosef. On Shabbat, they studied the topics of the tractate in the Rambam. The brothers also learned grammar, arithmetic, and English, which was the official language at the time, and for that a special teacher was brought to their home.

In 5795 (1935) their father was elected to be rabbi of Ramat Hasharon.

Mesivta and Beis Medrash 
In Elul 5784 (1935), the sons were sent to the Lomzha yeshiva, following Gershon's pleas. They arrived at the yeshiva on the 1st of Elul, having travelled on foot from their home to Petach Tikva (where the Yeshiva was), and did not know that the zman (semester) had started the day before. The Mashgiach, Rabbi Avraham Abba Grosbard, said he no longer had room for them. The secretary of the yeshiva, Rabbi Shlomo Zalman Mozes (father of Menachem Eliezer Mozes) met/encountered them and invited them to sleep in his house, until beds were found for them in the Yeshiva in the beginning of Cheshvan. At the behest of their father, they joined Rabbi Shmuel Rozovsky's group.

A year later, their father married again to a woman named Rachel. He asked them to come home, as the Rebbetzin now took care of the house, and they could study Torah full-time. The brothers returned to their study schedule with their father. In the winter of 5704 (1943-1944), when the Ponevezh Yeshiva was established, Rabbi Shmuel Rozovsky, who was appointed head of the yeshiva, came to ask their father that they should join the group of the yeshiva's founders. Gershon and Yaakov were among the first six students in the yeshiva, which was then located in the Ligman Synagogue in Bnei Brak. The yeshiva bochurim would sleep in rooms rented for them in the city; the two young brothers lived in the house of Rabbi Michel Yehuda Lefkowitz, who rented the only bedroom in the house to Rabbi Rozovsky.

The founder of the yeshiva, Rabbi Yosef Shlomo Kahaneman, appointed Gershon to teach Holocaust refugee students who had come to the orphanage "Batei Avos", and in 5706 (1945-6) he was appointed to give lessons to the young students at the yeshiva. In 5708 (1947-8) he married Henya Rachel (d. Oct. 1, 2001), daughter of Rabbi Yehoshua Zelig Diskin, rabbi of Pardes Channa, and in the same year he was appointed by Rabbi Kahneman to the Reish Mesivta (dean?) of the yeshiva.

Rabbi Edelstein was close to Rabbi Avraham Yeshayahu Karelitz, the Chazon Ish. After the death of Edelstein's father on the 20th of Cheshvan, 5711 (1950), he hesitated whether to take over the role of rabbi of Ramat Hasharon; however, since he already held a position in the yeshiva and in light of his wife's refusal to uproot from Bnei Brak, the role was assigned to his brother Rabbi Yaakov instead.

Rosh Yeshiva 
In the mid-1990s, succession struggles emerged in the Ponevezh yeshiva. In accordance with the Beis Din's ruling on the matter, Rabbi Edelstein began giving the shiur klali (general lecture given regularly to the entire Yeshiva) in Iyar 5760 (2000) - thus effectively becoming the head of the yeshiva together with Rabbi Baruch Dov Povarsky. After that, Rabbi Shmuel Markowitz joined them as well in the position.

Due to the dispute, Rabbi Edelstein led the yeshiva to split into two, and today there are actually two yeshivas in the Ponevezh Yeshiva complex - one headed by him and Rabbi Povarsky, and the other headed by Rabbi Markowitz. His yeshiva's Shabbat and holiday prayers are held in the "Holy Tabernacle" [ 8 ], and not in the yeshiva hall.

In 5783 (2003), he was added to the Moetzes Gedolei HaTorah (Council of Great Torah [Sages]) of the Degel HaTorah political party.

In the year 5761 (2001), in the middle of a shiur being given by Rabbi Edelstein, some of his opponents erupted and caused a riot in the place, with the aim of stopping the lesson. Rabbi Aharon Yehuda Leib Shteinman sent him a letter with a request that he forgive them. In 5768 (2008), his opponents threw a cup of leben at him from a building window. Following this, a rally was held in support of him at his yeshiva, with the participation of Rabbis Chaim Kanievsky, Michel Yehuda Lefkovitz, and Nissim Karelitz. Rabbi Aharon Leib Steinman sent a letter to the assembly.

After the passing of his wife, Edelstein founded a class in Seder Taharot in his home on Motza'ei Shabbos, for the elevation of her soul .

Rabbi Edelstein has been serving as Baal Toke'a at the Ponivezh yeshiva since 5706 (1945).

After Aharon Leib Shteinman, the spiritual leader of the Degel HaTorah political party, died in 2017, Edelstein became the joint new leader alongside Chaim Kanievsky. After Kanievsky's death in 2022, Edelstein became the sole leader. He is also a member of the Moetzes Gedolei HaTorah in Israel.

Positions

Personal Life

References

1923 births
Living people
Rosh yeshivas
Israeli Rosh yeshivas
Ponevezh Rosh yeshivas
Israeli Orthodox Jews
Israeli Orthodox rabbis
Haredi rabbis in Israel
Rabbis in Bnei Brak
Soviet emigrants to Israel